Vito d'Asio is a comune (municipality) in the Province of Pordenone in the Italian region Friuli-Venezia Giulia, located about  northwest of Trieste and about  northeast of Pordenone.

Small villages (Frazione)
Anduins, Casiacco, San Francesco, Pielungo, Battaias, Battain, Brich, Ringans, Carlutz, Castello Ceconi, Cedolins, Cerdevol, Chiaval, Clementins, Dean, Pert, Pian del Ferro, Chiamp, Cosoi, Forno, Giallinars, Gotz, Juris, Carlutz, La Busa, La Val, Ross, Surcins, Toffoi, Michiai, Tinei, Fruinz, Sacoças, Marins, Nandrus, Paveon, Reonis, Selets, Stallon, Valentins, Vallata, Celante di Vito, Zanetz

Vito d'Asio borders the following municipalities: Castelnovo del Friuli, Cavazzo Carnico, Clauzetto, Forgaria nel Friuli, Pinzano al Tagliamento, Preone, Tramonti di Sotto, Trasaghis, Verzegnis.

People
Fiorenza Cedolins

References

External links

 Official website

Cities and towns in Friuli-Venezia Giulia